Margaret Gomm (27 March 1921 – 26 February 1974) was a British swimmer. She competed in the women's 200 metre breaststroke at the 1936 Summer Olympics.

References

1921 births
1974 deaths
British female swimmers
Olympic swimmers of Great Britain
Swimmers at the 1936 Summer Olympics
People from Brentford
Sportspeople from London
Female breaststroke swimmers